Luvvie may refer to:

 Luvvie Darling, a fictional character in the comic Viz
 Luvvies, a regular mini-section in the magazine Private Eye
 Luvvie Ajayi, writer and comedian
 The Luvvies, a spoof awards show